Maxim Velikov (born January 14, 1982) is a Russian professional ice hockey defenceman who currently plays with Amur Khabarovsk in the Kontinental Hockey League.

References

External links 

1982 births
Living people
Russian ice hockey defencemen
HC Dynamo Moscow players
Sportspeople from Saratov
Atlant Moscow Oblast players
HC MVD players
Amur Khabarovsk players
HC CSKA Moscow players